In geometry, a barycentric coordinate system is a coordinate system in which the location of a point is specified by reference to a simplex (a triangle for points in a plane, a tetrahedron for points in three-dimensional space, etc.). The barycentric coordinates of a point can be interpreted as masses placed at the vertices of the simplex, such that the point is the center of mass (or barycenter) of these masses. These masses can be zero or negative; they are all positive if and only if the point is inside the simplex.

Every point has barycentric coordinates, and their sum is not zero. Two tuples of barycentric coordinates specify the same point if and only if they are proportional; that is to say, if one tuple can be obtained by multiplying the elements of the other tuple by the same non-zero number. Therefore, barycentric coordinates are either considered to be defined up to multiplication by a nonzero constant, or normalized for summing to unity.

Barycentric coordinates were introduced by August Möbius in 1827. They are special homogenous coordinates. Barycentric coordinates are strongly related with Cartesian coordinates and, more generally, to affine coordinates (see ).

Barycentric coordinates are particularly useful in triangle geometry for studying properties that do not depend on the angles of the triangle, such as Ceva's theorem, Routh's theorem, and Menelaus's theorem. In computer-aided design, they are useful for defining some kinds of Bézier surfaces.

Definition 
Let  be  points in a Euclidean space, a flat or an affine space  of dimension  that are affinely independent; this means that there is no affine subspace of dimension  that contains all the points, or, equivalently that the points define a simplex. Given any point  there are scalars  that are not all zero, such that 

for any point . (As usual, the notation  represents the translation vector or free vector that maps the point  to the point .)

Moreover, the barycentric coordinates are also not changed if the auxiliary point , the origin, is changed.

The barycentric coordinates of a point are unique up to a scaling.

In some contexts, it is useful to make unique the barycentric coordinates of a point. This is obtained by imposing the condition
 
or equivalently by dividing every  by the sum of all  These specific barycentric  coordinates are called normalized or absolute barycentric coordinates. Sometimes, they are also called affine coordinates, although this term refers commonly to a slightly different concept.

Sometimes, it is the normalized barycentric coordinates that are called barycentric coordinates. In this case the above defined coordinates are called homogeneous barycentric coordinates.

With above notation, a tuple  such that

does not define any point, but the vector 

is independent from the origin . As the direction of this vector is not changed if all  are multiplied by the same scalar, the homogeneous tuple  defines a direction of lines, that is a point at infinity. See below for more details.

Relationship with Cartesian or affine coordinates
Barycentric coordinates are strongly related to Cartesian coordinates and, more generally, affine coordinates. For a space of dimension , these coordinate systems are defined relative to a point , the origin, whose coordinates are zero, and  points  whose coordinates are zero except that of index  that equals one.

A point has coordinates 
 
for such a coordinate system if and only if its normalized barycentric coordinates are

relatively to the points 

The main advantage of barycentric coordinate systems is to be symmetric with respect to the  defining points. They are therefore often useful for studying properties that are symmetric with respect to  points. On the other hand, distances and angles are difficult to express in general barycentric coordinate systems, and when they are involved, it is generally simpler to use a Cartesian coordinate system.

Relationship with projective coordinates
Homogeneous barycentric coordinates are also strongly related with some projective coordinates. However this relationship is more subtle than in the case of affine coordinates, and, for being clearly understood, requires a coordinate-free definition of the projective completion of an affine space, and a definition of a projective frame.

The projective completion of an affine space of dimension  is a projective space of the same dimension that contains the affine space as the complement of a hyperplane. The projective completion is unique up to an isomorphism. The hyperplane is called the hyperplane at infinity, and its points are the points at infinity of the affine space.

Given a projective space of dimension , a projective frame is an ordered set of  points that are not contained in the same hyperplane. A projective frame defines a projective coordinate system such that the coordinates of the th point of the frame are all equal, and, otherwise, all coordinates of the th point are zero, except the th one.

When constructing the projective completion from an affine coordinate system, one defines commonly it with respect to a projective frame consisting of the intersections with the hyperplane at infinity of the coordinate axes, the origin of the affine space, and the point that has all its affine coordinates equal to one. This implies that the points at infinity have their last coordinate equal to zero, and that the projective coordinates of a point of the affine space are obtained by completing its affine coordinates by one as th coordinate.

When one has  points in an affine space that define a barycentric coordinate system, this is another projective frame of the projective completion that is convenient to choose. This frame consists of these points and their centroid, that is the point that has all its barycentric coordinates equal. In this case, the homogeneous barycentric coordinates of a point in the affine space are the same as the projective coordinates of this point. A point is at infinity if and only if the sum of its coordinates is zero.

Barycentric coordinates on triangles

In the context of a triangle, barycentric coordinates are also known as area coordinates or areal coordinates, because the coordinates of P with respect to triangle ABC are equivalent to the (signed) ratios of the areas of PBC, PCA and PAB to the area of the reference triangle ABC.  Areal and trilinear coordinates are used for similar purposes in geometry.

Barycentric or areal coordinates are extremely useful in engineering applications involving triangular subdomains. These make analytic integrals often easier to evaluate, and Gaussian quadrature tables are often presented in terms of area coordinates.

Each point  located inside this triangle can be written as a unique convex combination of the three vertices. In other words, for each  there is a unique sequence of three numbers,  such that  and

The three numbers  indicate the "barycentric" or "area" coordinates of the point  with respect to the triangle. Note that although there are three coordinates, there are only two degrees of freedom, since . Thus every point is uniquely defined by any two of the barycentric coordinates.

To explain why these coordinates are signed ratios of areas, let us assume that we work in the Euclidean space . Here, consider the Cartesian coordinate system  and its associated basis, namely . Consider also the positively oriented triangle  lying in the  plane.

where  stands for the mixed product of these three vectors.

Take , where  is an arbitrary point in the plane , and remark that

A subtle point regarding our choice of free vectors:  is, in fact, the equipollence class of the bound vector .

We have obtained that

Also,

Further, we deduce that

Similarly, the third barycentric coordinate reads as

Switching back and forth between the barycentric coordinates and other coordinate systems makes some problems much easier to solve.

Conversion between barycentric and Cartesian coordinates

Edge approach 

That is, the Cartesian coordinates of any point are a weighted average of the Cartesian coordinates of the triangle's vertices, with the weights being the point's barycentric coordinates summing to unity.

To find the reverse transformation, from Cartesian coordinates to barycentric coordinates, we first substitute  into the above to obtain

Rearranging, this is

This linear transformation may be written more succinctly as

Thus, we can rearrange the above equation to get

Explicitly, the formulae for the barycentric coordinates of point  in terms of its Cartesian coordinates (x, y) and in terms of the Cartesian coordinates of the triangle's vertices are:

Vertex approach 
The barycentric coordinates are thus the solution of the linear systemwhich iswhere is twice the signed area of the triangle. The area interpretation of the barycentric coordinates can be recovered by applying Cramer's rule to this linear system.

Conversion between barycentric and trilinear coordinates
A point with trilinear coordinates x : y : z has barycentric coordinates ax : by : cz where a, b, c are the side lengths of the triangle.  Conversely, a point with barycentrics  has trilinears

Equations in barycentric coordinates

The three sides a, b, c respectively have equations

The equation of a triangle's Euler line is

Using the previously given conversion between barycentric and trilinear coordinates, the various other equations given in Trilinear coordinates#Formulas can be rewritten in terms of barycentric coordinates.

Distance between points

where a, b, c are the sidelengths of the triangle.

The barycentric coordinates of a point can be calculated based on distances di to the three triangle vertices by solving the equation

Applications

Determining location with respect to a triangle 
Although barycentric coordinates are most commonly used to handle points inside a triangle, they can also be used to describe a point outside the triangle.  If the point is not inside the triangle, then we can still use the formulas above to compute the barycentric coordinates.  However, since the point is outside the triangle, at least one of the coordinates will violate our original assumption that .  In fact, given any point in cartesian coordinates, we can use this fact to determine where this point is with respect to a triangle.

If a point lies in the interior of the triangle, all of the Barycentric coordinates lie in the open interval   If a point lies on an edge of the triangle but not at a vertex, one of the area coordinates  (the one associated with the opposite vertex) is zero, while the other two lie in the open interval  If the point lies on a vertex, the coordinate associated with that vertex equals 1 and the others equal zero. Finally, if the point lies outside the triangle at least one coordinate is negative.

Summarizing,
Point  lies inside the triangle if and only if .

Otherwise,  lies outside the triangle.

In particular, if a point lies on the far side of a line the barycentric coordinate of the point in the triangle that is not on the line will have a negative value.

Interpolation on a triangular unstructured grid 

Barycentric coordinates provide a convenient way to compute this interpolation.

In this case, we have many triangles, each corresponding to a different part of the space. To interpolate a function  at a point , first a triangle must be found that contains . To do so,  is transformed into the barycentric coordinates of each triangle. If some triangle is found such that the coordinates satisfy , then the point lies in that triangle or on its edge (explained in the previous section). Then the value of  can be interpolated as described above.

These methods have many applications, such as the  finite element method (FEM).

Integration over a triangle or tetrahedron 

The integral of a function over the domain of the triangle can be annoying to compute in a cartesian coordinate system.  One generally has to split the triangle up into two halves, and great messiness follows.  Instead, it is often easier to make a change of variables to any two barycentric coordinates, e.g. .  Under this change of variables,

where  is the area of the triangle. Similarly, for integration over a tetrahedron, instead of breaking up the integral into two or three separate pieces, one could switch to 3D tetrahedral coordinates under the change of variables

where  is the volume of the tetrahedron.

Examples of special points

The centroid has barycentrics 

The circumcenter of a triangle ABC has barycentric coordinates

where  are edge lengths  respectively of the triangle.

The orthocenter has barycentric coordinates

The incenter has barycentric coordinates

The excenters' barycentrics are

The nine-point center has barycentric coordinates

Barycentric coordinates on tetrahedra

Barycentric coordinates may be easily extended to three dimensions. The 3D simplex is a tetrahedron, a polyhedron having four triangular faces and four vertices.

This is again a linear transformation, and we may extend the above procedure for triangles to find the barycentric coordinates of a point  with respect to a tetrahedron:

where  is now a 3×3 matrix:

and with the corresponding Cartesian coordinates:Once again, the problem of finding the barycentric coordinates has been reduced to inverting a 3×3 matrix.  

3D barycentric coordinates may be used to decide if a point lies inside a tetrahedral volume, and to interpolate a function within a tetrahedral mesh, in an analogous manner to the 2D procedure. Tetrahedral meshes are often used in finite element analysis because the use of barycentric coordinates can greatly simplify 3D interpolation.

Generalized barycentric coordinates 
Barycentric coordinates  of a point  that are defined with respect to a finite set of k points  instead of a simplex are called generalized barycentric coordinates. For these, the equation

is still required to hold. Usually one uses normalized coordinates, . If there are more points than in a full simplex the generalized barycentric coordinates of a point are not unique, as the defining linear system (here for n=2)is underdetermined. The simplest example is a quadrilateral in the plane. Various kinds of additional restrictions can be used to define unique barycentric coordinates.

Abstraction 
More abstractly, generalized barycentric coordinates express a convex polytope with n vertices, regardless of dimension, as the image of the standard -simplex, which has n vertices – the map is onto:  The map is one-to-one if and only if the polytope is a simplex, in which case the map is an isomorphism; this corresponds to a point not having unique generalized barycentric coordinates except when P is a simplex.

Dual to generalized barycentric coordinates are slack variables, which measure by how much margin a point satisfies the linear constraints, and gives an embedding  into the f-orthant, where f is the number of faces (dual to the vertices). This map is one-to-one (slack variables are uniquely determined) but not onto (not all combinations can be realized).

This use of the standard -simplex and f-orthant as standard objects that map to a polytope or that a polytope maps into should be contrasted with the use of the standard vector space  as the standard object for vector spaces, and the standard affine hyperplane  as the standard object for affine spaces, where in each case choosing a linear basis or affine basis provides an isomorphism, allowing all vector spaces and affine spaces to be thought of in terms of these standard spaces, rather than an onto or one-to-one map (not every polytope is a simplex). Further, the n-orthant is the standard object that maps to cones.

Applications 

Generalized barycentric coordinates have applications in computer graphics and more specifically in geometric modelling. Often, a three-dimensional model can be approximated by a polyhedron such that the generalized barycentric coordinates with respect to that polyhedron have a geometric meaning. In this way, the processing of the model can be simplified by using these meaningful coordinates. Barycentric coordinates are also used in geophysics.

See also
Ternary plot
Convex combination
Water pouring puzzle
Homogeneous coordinates

References 

Scott, J. A. Some examples of the use of areal coordinates in triangle geometry, Mathematical Gazette 83, November 1999, 472–477.
Schindler, Max; Chen, Evan (July 13, 2012). Barycentric Coordinates in Olympiad Geometry (PDF). Retrieved 14 January 2016.
Clark Kimberling's Encyclopedia of Triangles Encyclopedia of Triangle Centers. Archived from the original on 2012-04-19. Retrieved 2012-06-02.
 
 
 Barycentric Calculus In Euclidean And Hyperbolic Geometry: A Comparative Introduction, Abraham Ungar, World Scientific, 2010
 Hyperbolic Barycentric Coordinates, Abraham A. Ungar, The Australian Journal of Mathematical Analysis and Applications, Vol.6, No.1, Article 18, pp. 1–35, 2009
 
 
 Barycentric coordinates computation in homogeneous coordinates, Vaclav Skala, Computers and Graphics, Vol.32, No.1, pp. 120–127, 2008

External links 
 Law of the lever
 The uses of homogeneous barycentric coordinates in plane euclidean geometry
 Barycentric Coordinates – a collection of scientific papers about (generalized) barycentric coordinates
 Barycentric coordinates: A Curious Application (solving the "three glasses" problem) at cut-the-knot
 Accurate point in triangle test
 Barycentric Coordinates in Olympiad Geometry by Evan Chen and Max Schindler
 Barycenter command and TriangleCurve command at Geogebra.

Linear algebra
Affine geometry
Triangle geometry
Coordinate systems
Two-dimensional coordinate systems